Pahneh Kola or Pahneh Kala may refer to either of two villages in Sari County, Iran:

 Pahneh Kola-ye Jonubi (South Paneh Kola)
 Pahneh Kola-ye Shomali (North Paneh Kola)